Bacchetti is an Italian surname. Notable people with the surname include:

 Andrea Bacchetti (musician) (born 1977), Italian pianist
 Andrea Bacchetti (rugby union) (born 1988), Italian rugby union player
Antonio Bacchetti (1923–1979), Italian footballer
Loris Bacchetti (born 1993), Italian footballer

Italian-language surnames